John Potter is an English tenor and academic.

Early life and education
John Potter's musical education began as a chorister in the Choir of King's College, Cambridge, after which he became a scholar at The King's School, Canterbury and exhibitioner at Gonville and Caius College, Cambridge.  His coaches included lieder specialist Walter Gruner, accompanist Paul Hamburger, and the tenor Peter Pears.

Performance
Potter specialises in early and contemporary classical music vocal music. In addition to his solo work, he has performed with many vocal ensembles including the Hilliard Ensemble, The Swingle Singers, The Dowland Project, the Gavin Bryars Ensemble, and Red Byrd, of which he is a co-founder. His discography includes over 100 recordings encompassing his eclectic musical interests including Léonin and Led Zeppelin. He has received a fifth gold disc for the Hilliard Ensemble's Officium album.

He is also an ensemble coach, mentoring groups such as Trio Mediæval from Norway, The Kassiopeia Ensemble from the Netherlands, and Juice from the United Kingdom. His later collaborations have included Being Dufay with electronic music composer Ambrose Field and the lutenist and vihuela player Ariel Abramovich.

Academic work
Potter is a reader emeritus for the Music Department at the University of York; before retirement he was the director of the Vocal Studies postgraduate program. His research interests include the sociology of vocal music and vocal repertory, especially Renaissance and contemporary music.

Potter is the editor of the  Cambridge Companion to Singing (1998) and is the author of numerous articles in academic publications. His books include:
Vocal authority: Singing Style and Ideology, Cambridge University Press, 1998
Tenor: History of a Voice, Yale University Press, 2009
A History of Singing (with Neil Sorrell), Cambridge University Press, 2012

References

External links
 John Potter's Homepage
 John Potter's Profile at the University of York
 Biography at Bach-Cantatas.com
 John Potter at Hyperion Records
 The Cambridge Companion to Singing at Google Books
  Tenor: History of a voice at Google Books

Year of birth missing (living people)
Living people
Academics of the University of York
English classical musicians
English tenors
Contemporary classical music performers
ECM Records artists
Alumni of Gonville and Caius College, Cambridge
British performers of early music
Choristers of the Choir of King's College, Cambridge